School prayer, in the context of religious liberty, is state-sanctioned or mandatory prayer by students in public schools. Depending on the country and the type of school, state-sponsored prayer may be required, permitted, or prohibited. The United Kingdom also requires daily worship by law, but does not enforce it. Countries which prohibit or limit school prayer often differ in their reasons for doing so. In the United States, school prayer cannot be required of students in accordance with the Establishment Clause of the First Amendment to the United States Constitution. This is generally rigorously applied in public schools; the Establishment Clause does not prevent prayer in private schools that have no public funding. In Canada, school-sponsored prayer is disallowed under the concept of freedom of conscience as outlined in the Canadian Charter on Rights & Fundamental Freedoms. School-sponsored prayer is disallowed in France as a byproduct of its status as a secular nation.

Countries that permit school-sponsored prayer

Indonesia 

School prayers are a longstanding tradition in Indonesian schools. There is no specific law mandating school prayers in Indonesia. Before a religious education lesson, students pray according to their respective religions. On 10 December 2014, Minister of Education and Culture Anies Baswedan proposed to regulate the contents of school prayers before and after school. He denied rumours that he wanted to ban school prayers.

United Kingdom 
In England and Wales, the School Standards and Framework Act 1998 states that all pupils in state schools must take part in a daily act of collective worship, unless their parents request that they be excused from attending. A religion required is not, anymore, stated with in the legislative document provided by His Majesty's Government and drafted by the Office of the Parliamentary Counsel, the document furthermore declares that if a parent of a child within the school decides not to receive further religious education, they will be exempt from it hencewith. Despite this statutory requirement for schools to hold a daily act of collective worship, most do not. Ofsted's 2002-03 annual report, for example, stated that 80% of secondary schools were not providing daily worship for all pupils.

School Standards and Framework Act 1998; c. 31; Part II; Chapter VI; Religious Worship; Section 70

70           Requirements relating to collective worship 
(1)   Subject to section 71, each pupil in attendance at a community, foundation or voluntary school shall on each school day take part in an act of  

collective worship.

(2)   Subject to section 71, in relation to any community, foundation or voluntary school—

(a)   the [F1local authority] and the governing body shall exercise their functions with a view to securing, and

(b)   the head teacher shall secure,

that subsection (1) is complied with.

(3)   Schedule 20 makes further provision with respect to the collective worship required by this section, 

including provision relating to—

(a)   the arrangements which are to be made in connection with such worship, and

(b)   the nature of such worship.

The Department of Education in England states that all schools must maintain religious prayer in schools in order to reflect the beliefs and traditions of the country, which were conventionally of the Christian faith (as of mid-2010's there has been a demographic increase in the number of schools of Islamic or Muslim nature). However, a recent BBC radio study shows that 64% of children (out of 500) do not attend or participate in daily acts of worship or prayer. Regarding public opinion in the United Kingdom for mandated school prayer, the numbers are relatively similar. In fact, a 2011 survey conducted by BBC found that 60% of parents (out of the 1,743 questioned) believed that the legislation that requires group worship should not be enforced at all. Although parents do retain the right to officially keep their children from taking part in daily worship, there are critics who claim the legislation should be changed or discarded completely in order to allow for religious freedom and cater to the wants of parents, children, and staff.

Countries that prohibit school-sponsored prayer

United States

Canada

British Columbia 
Prior to 1944, in British Columbia, the Public Schools Act (1872) permitted the use of the Lord’s Prayer in opening or closing school. In 1944, the government of British Columbia amended the Public Schools Act to provide for compulsory Bible reading at the opening of the school day, to be followed by a compulsory recitation of the Lord’s Prayer. This amendment appeared as section 167 of the Public Schools Act, and read as follows:

167. All public schools shall be opened by the reading, without explanation or comment, of a passage of Scripture to be selected from readings prescribed or approved by the Council of Public Instruction. The reading of the passage of Scripture shall be followed by the recitation of the Lord’s Prayer, but otherwise the schools shall be conducted on strictly secular and non-sectarian principles. The highest morality shall be inculcated, but no religious dogma or creed shall be taught. 1948, c.42, s.167

The compulsory nature of the Bible reading and prayer recitation was slightly modified by regulations drawn up by the Council of Public Instruction. These regulations provided that either a teacher or student who has conscientious ground for objecting to the religious observances may be excused from them. The procedure to be followed in such cases was outlined in the regulations, which follow in full:Division (15)—Scripture Readings (Section 167)
15.01 Where a teacher sends a written notice to the Board of School Trustees or official trustee by whom he is employed that he has conscientious objections to conducting the. ceremony of reading prescribed selections from the Bible and reciting the Lord’s Prayer (as provided by Section 167 of the Public Schools Act), he shall be excused from such duty, and in such case it shall be the duty of the Board of School Trustees or official trustee concerned to arrange with the Principal to have the ceremony conducted by some other teacher in the school, or by a school trustee, or, where neither of these alternatives is possible, by one of the senior pupils of the school or by some other suitable person other than an ordained member of a religious sect or denomination.

15.02 Where the parent or guardian of any pupil attending a public school sends a written notice to the teacher of the pupil stating that for conscientious reasons he does not wish the pupil to attend the ceremony of reading prescribed selections from the Bible and reciting the Lord’s Prayer at the opening of school, the teacher shall excuse the pupil from attendance at such ceremony and at his discretion may assign the pupil some other useful employment at school during that period, but the pupil so excused shall not be deprived of any other benefits of the school by reason of his non-attendance at the ceremony.

In 1982, the Canadian Charter of Rights and Freedoms received royal assent. Section 2 of the charter guaranteeing freedom of conscience and freedom of religion trumped Section 167 of the Public Schools Act (1872). Sixteen years later in 1996, based on precedent that would be established in Ontario (1989), required recitation of the Lord’s Prayer as outlined in the Public Schools Act would be held to violate the Charter of Rights and Freedoms.

Ontario 
The challenges to Christian opening and closing exercises occurred mainly in Ontario with the crucial case being fought in The Ontario Court of Appeal in 1988.

Zylberberg v. Sudbury Board of Education (Director) The Ontario Court of Appeal ruled that the use of the Lord’s Prayer in opening exercises in public schools offended the Charter s. 2(a). 1988. (1988), 65 O.R. (2d) 641, 29 O.A.C. 23 (C.A.). Education regulations did not require the use of the Lord's Prayer and there was an exemption provision. The Ontario Court of Appeal ruled that the regulation infringed religious freedom because schools could use only the Lord's Prayer rather than a more inclusive approach. It was argued that the exemption provision effectively stigmatized children and coerced them into a religious observance which was offensive to them.

The Ontario Court of Appeal was persuaded by the argument that the need to seek exemption from Christian exercises is itself a form of religious discrimination. The judges described as insensitive the position of the respondents that it was beneficial for the minority children to confront the fact of their difference from the majority.

Russow v. British Columbia 
In 1989, Joan Russow challenged, in the British Columbia Supreme Court, the Public Schools Acts requirement that in British Columbia all public schools were to be opened with the Lord’s Prayer and a Bible reading. The argument was similar to the Zylberberg case and the result was the same: The offending words in the Public Schools Act were removed as being inconsistent with freedom of conscience and religion guarantees in the Canadian Charter of Rights and Freedoms. Further following the Zylberberg case to strike down use of the Lord’s Prayer in schools, the British Columbia Supreme Court incorporated the Ontario Court of Appeal's decision in Zylberberg in its entirety.

From 1871 to 1989, observance of school prayer had declined.

With the unfavorable court decision, the requirement for Christian morning exercises was replaced with the following clauses found in the School Act (1996) in British Columbia.
Conduct:
76 (1) All schools and Provincial schools must be conducted on strictly secular and nonsectarian principles.
(2) The highest morality must be inculcated, but no religious dogma or creed is to be – taught in a school or Provincial school.

France 
As a secular state (laïcité), France has no school prayers in secular state-run institutions. Instead, public servants are advised to keep their religious faith private, and may be censured if they display it too openly. The French law on secularity and conspicuous religious symbols in schools goes beyond restricting prayer in schools and bans the wearing of conspicuous religious symbols by pupils in public primary and secondary schools. However, teachers in private religious schools have been paid by the government.

India 

Being a secular state, religious instructions are prohibited in schools wholly owned by the state and hence schools prayers are not allowed. However, Indian law also allows Islamic and other minority religious schools to receive partial financial support from state and central government of India, to offer religious indoctrination, if the school agrees that the student has an option to opt out from religious indoctrination if he or she so asks, and that the school will not discriminate any student based on religion, race or other grounds.

Turkey 

The predominantly Muslim country of Turkey is in the public sphere a strongly secular state. In this regard, it is much like France, on whose system of laïcism Turkey's founder Mustafa Kemal Atatürk modelled the rules on religion when he reformed his country in the early 20th century. School prayer is therefore unknown, and suspected religious motivations can cause serious difficulties for public servants. Despite its primarily secular stance, however, courses of religion and morals (which are dominantly Islamic) are compulsory to all students during the last years of elementary and throughout high school. In these instances, various Islamic prayers and verses are both taught and tested for.

Ongoing debate

Arguments for and against school prayer 
The issue of school prayer remains contentious even where courts as diverse as those in Canada, the United States, Russia, and Poland attempt to strike a balance between religious and secular activity in state-sponsored arenas.  Some arguments have held that religion in schools is both an effective sociomoral tool as well as a valuable means to psychological stability. On the opposing side, others have argued that prayer has no place in a classroom where impressionable students are continually subject to influence by the majority. The latter view holds that, to the extent that a public school itself promotes the majority religion, the state is guilty of coercive interference in the lives of the individual.

See also 
 Freedom of religion
 Moment of silence
 Madalyn Murray O'Hair
 Separation of church and state
 Status of religious freedom by country

References 

Prayer
Religion and education
Religion and children